Intimate Cabaret was a British television programme broadcast from 1937 to 1939 on BBC Television. It was one of several spin-offs from the BBC series Cabaret. It was a live variety programme.  There were 24 episodes. The first seven were produced by Harry Pringle and the last two by Eric Fawcett; the producers of the others are not known. No episode has survived.

Performers 
Their numbers of appearances are given in parentheses.
 BBC Television Orchestra (1) 
 Evel Burns, pianist (before 1937after 1946) (6) 
 Jane Carr (190957), English actress (1) 
 Cyril Fletcher (19132005), English comedian (4) 
 Steven Geray (190473), Hungarian-born actor (2) 
 Tommy Handley (18921949), British comedian (1) 
 Bruno Hoffmann (191391), German player of the glass harp (1) 
 Stanley Holloway (18901982), English comedian (1) 
 Nelson Keys (18861939), British actor and singer (1) 
 Magda Kun (191245), Hungarian-born actress (2) 
 Eve Lister (191397), British actress (1) 
 Billy Mayerl (190259), English pianist and composer (1) 
 Derek Oldham (18871968), English singer and actor (1) 
 Irene Prador (191196), Austrian actress (2) 
 Oliver Wakefield (190956), British actor and comedian (3)

See also 
 Cabaret (British TV series)
 Cabaret Cartoons
 Cabaret Cruise
 Comedy Cabaret
 Eastern Cabaret
 Western Cabaret

Notes

References

External links
 
 

1930s British television series
1937 British television series debuts
1939 British television series endings
Lost BBC episodes
BBC Television shows
Black-and-white British television shows
British variety television shows